Salem Al-Najdi (born 27 January 2003) is a Saudi professional footballer who currently plays as a left-back or a left winger for Al-Fateh.

Career
Al-Najdi began his career at the youth team of Al-Fateh. On 23 August 2021, Al-Najdi signed his first professional contract with the club. He was called up to the first-team after a number of first-team players tested positive for COVID-19. Al-Najdi was named on the bench for the first time on 1 January 2022 in the match against Al-Nassr. On 27 June 2022, Al-Najdi made his first-team debut for Al-Fateh in the 2–1 loss to Al-Nassr.

International career

Saudi Arabia U20
Al-Najdi was called up to the under-20 national team for the first time on 12 January 2021. He was named in the squad taking part in the 2022 Arab Cup U-20. He started every match throughout the competition as the Green Falcons won their second consecutive title.

Honours

International
Saudi Arabia U20
Arab Cup U-20: 2022

References

 

2003 births
Living people
Saudi Arabian footballers
Saudi Arabia youth international footballers
Al-Fateh SC players
Saudi Professional League players
Association football wingers
Association football fullbacks